Thiagus Petrus Gonçalves dos Santos (born 25 January 1989) is a Brazilian handball player for FC Barcelona and the Brazilian national team.

Achievements
EHF Champions League:
Winner: 2021, 2022
IHF Super Globe:
Winner: 2019
Liga ASOBAL:
Winner: 2019, 2020, 2021, 2022
Copa del Rey:
Winner: 2019, 2020, 2021, 2022
Copa ASOBAL:
Winner: 2019, 2020, 2021, 2022, 2023
Supercopa ASOBAL:
Winner: 2019, 2020, 2021, 2022
Supercopa Ibérica:
Winner: 2022
Hungarian League:
Winner: 2018

Individual awards
2018 Pan American Men's Handball Championship: Best left back
2022 South and Central American Men's Handball Championship: MVP

References

External links

1989 births
Living people
Brazilian male handball players
People from Juiz de Fora
Expatriate handball players
Brazilian expatriate sportspeople in Hungary
Brazilian expatriate sportspeople in Spain
SC Pick Szeged players
FC Barcelona Handbol players
Liga ASOBAL players
Handball players at the 2016 Summer Olympics
Olympic handball players of Brazil
Handball players at the 2015 Pan American Games
Handball players at the 2019 Pan American Games
Pan American Games medalists in handball
Pan American Games gold medalists for Brazil
Pan American Games bronze medalists for Brazil
South American Games gold medalists for Brazil
South American Games medalists in handball
Competitors at the 2018 South American Games
Medalists at the 2015 Pan American Games
Medalists at the 2019 Pan American Games
Handball players at the 2020 Summer Olympics
Sportspeople from Minas Gerais